"Nothing about us without us" is a slogan used to communicate the idea that no policy should be decided by any representative without the full and direct participation of members of the group(s) affected by that policy. In its modern form, this often involves national, ethnic, disability-based, or other groups that are often marginalized from political, social, and economic opportunities.

The saying has its origins in Central European political traditions. It was the political motto that helped establish—and, loosely translated into Latin, provided the name for—Poland's 1505 constitutional legislation, Nihil novi, which first transferred governing authority from the monarch to the parliament. It subsequently became a byword for democratic norms.

It is also a long-standing principle of Hungarian law and foreign policy, and was a cornerstone of the foreign policy of interwar Poland.

The term in its English form came into use in disability activism during the 1990s. James Charlton relates that he first heard the term used in talks by South African disability activists Michael Masutha and William Rowland, who had in turn heard the phrase used by an unnamed East European activist at an earlier international disability rights conference. In 1998, Charlton used the saying as title for a book on disability rights. Disability rights activist David Werner used the same title for another book, also published in 1998. In 2004, the United Nations used the phrase as the theme of International Day of Persons with Disabilities and it is also associated with the Convention on the Rights of Persons with Disabilities.

Use of this slogan has expanded beyond the disability rights community to other interest groups and movements.

See also 
 Independent living movement
 Self-determination
 Self-determination theory
 Autonomy
 Human rights
 Disability studies
 Neurodiversity

References

External links 
 'Nothing About Us Without Us' - Recognizing the Rights of People with Disabilities- UN Chronicle 
  Nothing About Us Without Us: Human Rights and DisabilityZmag

Political catchphrases
Disability rights
Identity politics
Foreign relations of Hungary
Foreign relations of Poland
Second Polish Republic